Something Borrowed may refer to:

 Something Borrowed (novel), by Emily Giffin
 Something Borrowed (film), based on the novel
 "Something Borrowed" (How I Met Your Mother)
 "Something Borrowed" (Torchwood)
Something Borrowed - Something Blue, a 1966 album by Gerry Mulligan
Something Borrowed, Something Blue, a 1978 album by Tommy Flanagan
Something Borrowed, a story by Jim Butcher

See also
 Something old
 Something New (disambiguation)
 Something Blue (disambiguation)